Ngidi is a South African surname. Notable people with the surname include:

Lungi Ngidi (born 1996), South African cricketer 
Thulani Ngidi (born 1986), South African rugby union player 
Zanefa Ngidi (born 1986), South African Maskandi musician

Surnames of African origin